Bradley Nathan Richter (born August 9, 1969) is an American classical guitarist.

Education and background 

Richter was born in Enid, Oklahoma in 1969. At the age of 18, Richter was awarded the Presidential Scholarship to the American Conservatory of Music in Chicago where he began performing, composing, and eventually teaching professionally. After completing his undergraduate degrees in performance and composition, Richter accepted a scholarship to the Royal College of Music in London where he studied with guitarist Carlos Bonell.

Career highlights 

After completing his master's degree at the Royal College of Music in London, Richter has performed throughout North America and Europe as a soloist and in duos with artists such as Grammy-winner David Finckel of the Emerson String Quartet, Royal College of Music Professor Carlos Bonell, and Viktor Uzur (cello) as the Richter Uzur Duo. Festival appearances have included The Aspen Music Festival, The London International Guitar Festival and the Walnut Valley Festival, where he won the National Finger-picking Championship in 1999.

Richter is also an accomplished composer. In addition to his collections of concert music for solo guitar (published by Mel Bay and GSP), Richter is an avid composer of chamber music. He is a winner of the International Composers Guild Competition, and he wrote and performed a score for the Emmy award-winning PBS television series, The Desert Speaks. Richter is regularly featured on NPR's Performance Today as a soloist and with the Richter Uzur Duo.

Residency and outreach 

Richter has taught at the Sherwood Conservatory of Music in Chicago and the University of Arizona and given workshops around the United States since 1995. Most notably he is the co-founder and Executive Director of Lead Guitar, a nonprofit organization that establishes guitar programs in schools with large populations of at-risk kids. In 2013 Lead Guitar became part of the University of Arizona where Richter is now the Director of Arts Outreach for the College of Fine Arts.

Selected works

References

Further reading
 "Fractal Reflections, Brad Richter. Harmon Records". Arizona Daily Star. 
 "'String Theory': quantum leap of cello, guitar". Arizona Daily Star. 
 "The Guitar Hour: Brad Richter". Spokane Public Radio. – 49 minute radio interview (page includes link to listen to interview)
 "Guitarist's works alluring, majestic". Deseret News. 
 "Classical guitarist plays for students; public performance slated for Friday". Kingman Daily Miner. 
 "Musician Appointed to Teach Guitar". The Herald.  
 "Guitarist seeks 'conversation'". Deseret News.  
 "Richter's 'Whisper' has innovation, virtuosity". Deseret News.  
 "Guitarist Richter is home for CD release". Arizona Daily Star. 
 "Lauded guitarist Richter to perform". Arizona Daily Star .

External links 
 

American classical guitarists
American male guitarists
1969 births
Living people
Alumni of the Royal College of Music
Guitarists from Oklahoma
20th-century American guitarists
Musicians from Enid, Oklahoma
20th-century American male musicians